Isanthrene ustrina is a moth of the subfamily Arctiinae. It was described by Jacob Hübner in 1824. It is found on Cuba and in Brazil.

References

 

Euchromiina
Moths described in 1824